A by-election for the Prague 1 Senate seat was held in the Czech Republic on 27 and 28 August 1999. Václav Fischer was elected a member of Senate with over 70% of votes in the first round of voting. Fischer then became the most popular politician in polls.

Opinion polls

Results

References

Prague 1 by-election
Prague 1 by-election
Prague 1 by-election
Prague 1 by-election
1999
Senate district 27 – Prague 1
Elections in Prague